René Muzola Makondele (born 20 April 1982) is a Congolese former professional footballer who played as a winger. He made six appearances DR Congo national team scoring once.

Career
Born in Kinshasa, René Makondele started his career in DRC with Kinshasa City. He then was spotted by Swedish scouts from Djurgårdens IF who brought him to Sweden, alongside Yannick Bapupa and Blaise Mbemba. During his time in Djurgårdens IF he mostly came on as a substitute, and in 2005 he was loaned out to Allsvenskan rivals Gefle IF. He impressed Gefle manager Per Olsson enough for Gefle to buy him from Djurgården. He stayed with the club for another year and a half, when Helsingborgs IF signed him in the middle of the 2007 season. Following a lack of playing time in 2010, Makondele decided to leave Helsingborgs IF. His previous clubs, Gefle IF and Djurgårdens IF, showed interest in him, but he rejected both. Instead he joined BK Häcken, signing a three-year contract which starts on 1 January 2011, however following a minor dispute between the two clubs over when Makondele would leave Helsingborg, an agreement was reached and Makondele left Helsingborgs IF in the 2010 summer instead.

In late 2016, Makondele rejoined Gefle for the 2017 season.

Personal life
His cousin Guy-Guy Lema played alongside few years with him in Sweden and his other cousin Kuanzambi Barssabas da Cruz played a half-year for Torslanda IK.

Honours
Djurgårdens IF
 Allsvenskan: 2002, 2003

BK Häcken
Svenska Cupen: 2015-16

References

External links
 
 
 
 

1982 births
Living people
Democratic Republic of the Congo footballers
Association football wingers
Democratic Republic of the Congo international footballers
Djurgårdens IF Fotboll players
Gefle IF players
Helsingborgs IF players
BK Häcken players
Allsvenskan players
Footballers from Kinshasa